DN, dN, or dn may refer to:

Science, technology, and mathematics

Computing and telecommunications
 Digital number, the discrete  of an analog value sampled by an analog-to-digital converter
 Directory number in a phone system
 Distinguished Name, an identifier type in the LDAP protocol
 Domain name, an identification string used within the Internet
 Domain Nameserver
 DOS Navigator, a DOS file manager

Mathematics
 dn (elliptic function), one of Jacobi's elliptic functions
 Dn, a Coxeter–Dynkin diagram
 Dn, a dihedral group

Other uses in science and technology
 Decinewton (symbol dN), an SI unit of force
 Diametre Nominal, the European equivalent of Nominal Pipe Size
 Diameter of a rolling element bearing in mm multiplied by its speed in rpm
 Deductive-nomological model, a philosophical model for scientific explanation
 Double negative T cells, also called CD4−CD8−
 Diabetic nephropathy
 Diabetic neuropathy
 DN Factor, a value used to calculate the correct lubricant for bearings

Entertainment
 Double nil, a bid in the game of Spades (card game)
 Descriptive chess notation
 Duke Nukem, a video game character and a game franchise

Journalism
 The Ball State Daily News, the student newspaper of Ball State University in Muncie, Indiana
 Dagens Næringsliv, a Norwegian newspaper
 Dagens Nyheter, a Swedish newspaper
 Democracy Now!, the flagship program for the Pacifica Radio network
 Diário de Notícias, a Portuguese newspaper

Places
 Denmark (WMO country code DN)
 DN postcode area for Doncaster and surrounding areas, UK
 Dunedin, New Zealand (commonly abbreviated DN)

Other uses
 Down (disambiguation)
 Diebold Nixdorf, American financial technology company
 Digha Nikaya, a part of the Buddhist Tripitaka
 International DN, a kind of iceboat
 Dreadnought, a class of warships
 Debit note, a commercial document
 Norwegian Air Argentina, IATA code